Aransas National Wildlife Refuge is a 115,324-acre (466.7 km2) protected area situated on the southwest side of San Antonio Bay along the Gulf Coast of the U.S. state of Texas. It is located in parts of Aransas, Refugio, and Calhoun Counties. It is situated on the southwest side of the San Antonio Bay, formed by the mouth of the Guadalupe River. It also includes nearly the entirety of Matagorda Island, a 38-mile barrier island. The Aransas National Wildlife Refuge was established by Executive Order 7784 on 31 December 1937 by President Franklin D. Roosevelt as the Aransas Migratory Waterfowl Refuge as a refuge and breeding ground for migratory birds and other wildlife. Roosevelt issued a proclamation in 1940 changing the name to the Aransas National Wildlife Refuge.

In October 1938, Civilian Conservation Corps Company 880 established camp south of Austwell, Texas. They built roads, ditches, firebreaks, and the residence facilities for the refuge. They constructed part of the spillway for Burgentine Lake, which serves as a major resting area for migratory waterfowl. They also graded the road to Austwell.

Bird life includes ducks, herons, egrets, ibises, roseate spoonbills, and the endangered whooping crane, whose population has recovered significantly since the 1940s.

Other fauna include American alligators, collared peccaries, snakes, and bobcats, which inhabit the refuge's grasslands, blackjack oak thickets, freshwater ponds, and marshes.

Administration  
The Aransas National Wildlife Refuge is divided into five units, with two being contiguous and three being disconnected from the original Aransas unit. The Aransas Unit and Tatton Unit are located on the mainland, with the Aransas Unit being the original section of the refuge. The Aransas and Tatton Units are 47,261 acres and 7,568 acres, respectively. The Lamar and Myrtle Foester Whitmire Units are 979 acres and 3,440 acres, respectively. The largest unit is the Matagorda Island unit, with 56,683 acres. In its entirety, the refuge consists of 115,324 acres, and is the largest Fish and Wildlife Service protected area in the state of Texas.

See also
 Great Texas Coastal Birding Trail
 Wildlife refuge

References

 McNulty, Faith, The Wildlife Stories of Faith McNulty, Chap.6 "The Whooping Crane" (pages 121-309), Doubleday 1980 (Chap. 6 was originally published as a book of the same title by E.P. Dutton in 1966).  Much of her account deals with the work of Robert Porter Allen.

External links
 
 U.S. Fish & Wildlife Service: official Aransas National Wildlife Refuge website
 Wildtexas.com: Review of Aransas NWR
 RockportFulton.com: Exploring the Aransas National Wildlife Refuge
 U.S. Geological Survey Map at the U.S. Geological Survey Map Website. Retrieved February 2, 2023.

National Wildlife Refuges in Texas
Wetlands of Texas
Birdwatching sites in the United States
Gulf Coast of the United States
Protected areas of Aransas County, Texas
Protected areas of Calhoun County, Texas
Protected areas of Refugio County, Texas
Protected areas established in 1937
Landforms of Aransas County, Texas
Landforms of Calhoun County, Texas
Landforms of Refugio County, Texas